Yvan Bia (born 14 August 1935) is a French field hockey player. He competed in the men's tournament at the 1960 Summer Olympics.

References

External links
 

1935 births
Living people
French male field hockey players
Olympic field hockey players of France
Field hockey players at the 1960 Summer Olympics
Sportspeople from Calais